Saint Conaire (also Cannera, Cainder or Cainnear) (feast day 28 January) was an Irish holy woman who died in 530 AD. Originally from Bantry Bay in the south of Ireland, modern County Cork, she was an anchorite ; living in solitude in a self-imposed spiritual exile from society.  Nearing the end of her life, she had a vision of all the monasteries in Ireland, and, extending from each upwards to the Heavens, was a pillar of fire.

The fire-pillar from Saint Senán mac Geircinn’s monastery at Inis Cathaig, in the mouth of the Shannon River, was the highest, and the straightest towards Heaven ; and Conaire set off in its direction, judging it to be the most holy.

"Let me be buried on this most holiest of islands," related Conaire, to God, "for it is there that I wish my re-incarnation to be."

She set off on her journey, weakened by the effects of advanced age, but driven by determination and faith, walking the whole way to County Clare, and across to the island called Inis Cathaig in Irish.  When she arrived at Saint Senan’s monastery, he and his brother monks refused her admittance.  Senan offered that she should go stay with a kinswoman of his.

Although there were many monasteries throughout Ireland at that time which allowed both men and women, Senan and his brother monks believed that their chastity vows prohibited all contact with women.

"Christ came to redeem women no less than to redeem men. No less did he suffer for the sake of women than for the sake of men. No less than men, women enter into the heavenly kingdom. Why, then, should you not allow women to live on this place?" [2] reasoned Conaire to Senan ; but he would not forsake his extremist chastity vows, even for the holy Conaire.

"Well then here I will stay on this shore of Inis Cathaig until my demise," proclaimed Conaire.

"But, the waves will wash away your grave !" exclaimed an exasperated Senan.

"Leave that to God." said Conaire, and, after a victory over the world and the devil, she died.

Her grave is today marked by a simple flag off the coast of Scattery Island.

Saint Conaire is an early feminist icon of the Irish church, and the patron saint of sailors and fisherman, particularly on the West Coast of Ireland, where seagoing ships still make a stop at Inis Cathaig to collect a stone in honour of Conaire to protect them on their voyage.  The monastery at Scattery Island is still for men only.

She is the namesake of the ancient Irish bardic family Ó Maolconaire of Roscommon (Descendant of the Servant of Saint Conaire) who were Priomhseanachie na hÉireann, or the Antiquaries to the Kings, in Gaelic Ireland, and ran numerous schools of traditional poetry, history, and law throughout Ireland, and also of Saint Canera Catholic Church, in Neosho, Missouri.

Other Saints Named Cannera

There are several other medieval saints named Cannera or Cainnear venerated in Ireland and Scotland. Among them are:

St. Cannera Gloss or 'the Pure' of Rinn-hAllaidh, daughter of Caelan whose feast day was 5 November. 

St. Cannera (also known as Kennera or Kinnera) of Kirkinner, Scotland, reputedly a hermitess and possibly also a martyr. Her feast is 29 October. She may have been the same person as St. Cunera of Rhenen, a virgin martyr originally from Orkney in Scotland.

St. Cannera of Cluain Claraid, daughter of Fintan who was mentioned in the life of St. Molua. She was a first cousin of St. Brendan and was healed of muteness at the age of sixteen by Brendan. Her feast day is 6 November (feast of all the saints of Ireland).

St. Cannera of Cluain da Saileach (Clonsilla, Dublin), the mother of St. Mochua of Clondalkin and six other saints who were all bishops. She shares a feast day with her son on 6 August.

References

Medieval Irish saints
5th-century Irish people
People from County Clare